Cacao yellow mosaic virus (CYMV) is a virus in the family Tymoviridae that infects cacao trees in Sierra Leone.

Description
CYMV, like other Tymoviridae are non-enveloped viruses, surrounded by a capsid approximately 30 nanometers wide. The viral capsid has T = 3 symmetry. Tymoviridae have positive-sense single-stranded RNA genomes approximately 6 kilobases long.

Disease
In the cacao tree, CYMV infection leads to the appearance of large circular yellow blotches on the leaves. Infected trees are not killed or severely inhibited.

Ecology and distribution
CYMV has only been found in Sierra Leone where it primarily infects the cacao tree Theobroma cacao. However, it can experimentally infect a number of other dicots including Chenopodium amaranticolor, Chenopodium quinoa, Tetragonia expansa, Vinca rosea, Nicotiana clevelandii, and Nicandra physalodes.

References

External links 
 ICTVdB - The Universal Virus Database: Cacao yellow mosaic virus
 Family Groups - The Baltimore Method

Viral plant pathogens and diseases
Cacao diseases
Tymoviridae